Gasoline Alley is a 2022 American action thriller film directed by Edward John Drake, starring Devon Sawa, Bruce Willis and Luke Wilson.

It was released in the United States on February 25, 2022 by Saban Films.

This film is not about or related in any way to the comic strip Gasoline Alley, the restaurant Gasoline Alley in Akron, OH, or Gasoline Alley, Alberta.

Plot
Tattoo artist Jimmy Jayne is interviewed by Detectives Bill Freeman and Freddy Vargas, who are investigating a mass murder of prostitutes, after a lighter inscribed with his studio's name is found at the crime scene. Jayne is an ex-convict who did five years in prison for accidental manslaughter, and he was the last person to see one of the victims alive. Eventually, Freeman is revealed to be part of a human trafficking ring operating via a tunnel connecting San Diego to Tijuana. The film culminates in a shootout between Freeman and Jayne in a Mexican warehouse; with his expert marksman skills, Jayne incapacitates the rogue detective and his associate with a handful of bullets, and sets the place ablaze.

Cast
Bruce Willis as Detective Bill Freeman
Luke Wilson as Detective Freddy Vargas
Devon Sawa as Jimmy Jayne
Kat Foster as Christine
Sufe Bradshaw as Eleanor Rogers
Johnny Dowers as Erasmus Alcindor
Rick Salomon as Percy Muleeny
Kenny Wormald as Dennis Bourke
Ash Adams as Frank Flosso
Irina Antonenko as Star
Carrington Durham as Giselle
Hope Golds as Lana
Billy Harlow as Roy
Vernon Davis as Kaiser the Bouncer
Steve Eastin as Captain Lew Ferry 
Tracy Curry as Dr Feelgood

Production
Filming began in Tifton, Georgia in March 2021. In June 2021, Saban Films acquired distribution rights to the film.

Release
Gasoline Alley was released in theaters, digital and on VOD on February 25, 2022.

Box office
As of August 27, 2022, Gasoline Alley grossed $32,433 in the United Arab Emirates and Portugal.

Critical reception

References

External links
 
 

American action thriller films
Films set in California
Films shot in Georgia (U.S. state)
Films directed by Edward John Drake
2022 action thriller films
2020s English-language films
2022 independent films
Saban Films films
American independent films
2020s American films